The gonadotropin receptors are a group of receptors that bind a group of pituitary hormones called gonadotropins. They include the:

 Follicle-stimulating hormone receptor (FSHR) - binds follicle-stimulating hormone (FSH)
 Luteinizing hormone receptor (LHR) - binds luteinizing hormone (LH) and human chorionic gonadotropin (hCG)

See also
 GnRH receptor
 Sex hormone receptor

G protein-coupled receptors
Gonadotropin-releasing hormone and gonadotropins
Signal transduction
Cell signaling